Lazi may refer to :

 the Laz(i) people, which gave its name to Lazica region (Ancient Colchis) in present Georgia
 Lazi, Siquijor, municipality in the Philippines
 Lazi County, county in Tibet
 Lazi, Croatia, a village near Čabar
 Lázi, village in Hungary
 Lazi, Berane Municipality, a village in Montenegro